The 1919 New York Yankees season was the team's 17th season. The team finished with a record of 80–59, 7½ games behind the American League champion Chicago White Sox. New York was managed by Miller Huggins. Their home games were played at the Polo Grounds.

Offseason 
 December 18, 1918: Future Chicago Bears football coach George Halas was signed as a free agent by the Yankees.

Regular season

Season standings

Record vs. opponents

Roster

Player stats

Batting

Starters by position 
Note: Pos = Position; G = Games played; AB = At bats; H = Hits; Avg. = Batting average; HR = Home runs; RBI = Runs batted in

Other batters 
Note: G = Games played; AB = At bats; H = Hits; Avg. = Batting average; HR = Home runs; RBI = Runs batted in

Pitching

Starting pitchers 
Note: G = Games pitched; IP = Innings pitched; W = Wins; L = Losses; ERA = Earned run average; SO = Strikeouts

Other pitchers 
Note: G = Games pitched; IP = Innings pitched; W = Wins; L = Losses; ERA = Earned run average; SO = Strikeouts

Relief pitchers 
Note: G = Games pitched; W = Wins; L = Losses; SV = Saves; ERA = Earned run average; SO = Strikeouts

Notes

References 
1919 New York Yankees team page at www.baseball-almanac.com
1919 New York Yankees at Baseball Reference

New York Yankees seasons
New York Yankees
New York Yankees
1910s in Manhattan
Washington Heights, Manhattan